Kobe Tai is an American pornographic actress.

Pornographic film career
Tai was a contract performer with Vivid Entertainment. In 2011, Complex ranked her first on its list of "The Top 50 Hottest Asian Porn Stars of All Time".

Mainstream appearances
In addition to her roles in porn films, Tai (billed as "Carla Scott") appeared in the mainstream movie Very Bad Things, portraying a stripper at a bachelor party, and sang background vocals for Marilyn Manson's song, "New Model No. 15", on the album Mechanical Animals.

She was an Opening Night Guest of Honor along with Asia Carrera at the Big Apple Anime Fest's Midnight Anime Concourse.

Awards and nominations

References

External links

 Kobe Tai on Adult Video News
 
 
 

American female adult models
American pornographic film actresses
Living people
Year of birth unknown
Year of birth missing (living people)
21st-century American women